Eiran Joe Cashin (born 9 November 2001) is a professional footballer who plays as a centre-back for Derby County. Born in England, he is a youth international for the Republic of Ireland.

Club career

Derby County
A youth product of Derby County, Cashin signed his first professional contract with the club in the summer of 2020. He made his professional debut with Derby County on 11 December 2021, coming on as a late substitute in a 1–0 EFL Championship win over Blackpool. His first goal in senior football came on 30 April 2022, in a 2–0 win away to Blackpool. He played a total amount of eighteen league matches during the season, as Derby were eventually relegated to League One.

On 2 July 2022, following Derby's takeover by Clowes Developments, Cashin was able to extend his contract with the club until 2024.

International career
Born in England, Cashin is a youth international for the Republic of Ireland. He qualifies through a grandmother born in County Leitrim.

He played for the Republic of Ireland U18s in a 4–0 loss to the Turkey U18s in March 2019.

On 6 June 2022, Cashin made his debut for the Republic of Ireland U21 team, assisting the second goal in a 3–1 win over Montenegro U21 at Tallaght Stadium.

Career statistics

References

External links
 

2001 births
Living people
Footballers from Mansfield
Republic of Ireland association footballers
Republic of Ireland youth international footballers
Republic of Ireland under-21 international footballers
English footballers
English people of Irish descent
Association football defenders
Derby County F.C. players
English Football League players